Hoseynabad-e Asheq (also Romanized as Ḩoseynābād-e ‘Āsheq and Ḩoseynābād ‘Asheq; also known as Hosein Abad Ashegh, Ḩoseynābād, Ḩoseynābād-e Khān, and Husainābād) is a village in Kuhestan Rural District, in the Central District of Nain County, Isfahan Province, Iran. At the 2006 census, its population was 57, in 18 families.

References 

Populated places in Nain County